The 2004 World Polo Championship was played in Chantilly (France) during September 2004 and was won by Brazil. Brazil got its third World Polo Championship. This event brought together nine teams from around the world in the Polo Club du Domaine.

Matches

External links
 Federation of International Polo website

2004
Polo competitions in France
2004 in polo